Birds in the Trap Sing McKnight is the second studio album by American rapper Travis Scott. It was released on September 2, 2016, through Grand Hustle Records and distributed by Epic Records. It exclusively premiered through Travis Scott and Chase B's radio show Wav Radio on Beats 1 and Apple Music. The album features guest appearances from André 3000, Blac Youngsta, Kid Cudi, Nav, 21 Savage, Kendrick Lamar, Bryson Tiller, Young Thug, Quavo, K. Forest, and the Weeknd. Production was handled by a number of record producers, including Nav, Vinylz, Mike Dean, Cardo, Frank Dukes, and Allen Ritter, among others.

Birds in the Trap Sing McKnight was supported by three singles: "Wonderful", "Pick Up the Phone", and "Goosebumps". The album received generally favorable reviews from critics, debuting at number one on the US Billboard 200, earning 88,000 album units in the first week.

Background
On January 4, 2016, Scott announced on his Snapchat account that he would be revealing the title for his new album at the time. While going on the road, Scott had been tweeting on what the title is to the album on Twitter. He first removed all of his tweets, and announced the title to the album on the Anti World Tour. In an interview with Billboard, Scott explained the meaning of his album title: "My next album, Birds in the Trap Sing McKnight is basically about all my friends and growing up here [in Missouri City]. I'm not saying that it's a trap, we not in the fucking projects, but it's like a social trap. It's a social connection trap from what you want to do and how you want to express yourself. I feel like everyone just gets constricted by their parents or just life."

On March 30, 2016, Scott and Young Thug announced that they will be releasing their song in "the next few days". In April 2016, while Scott was performing in Houston, Texas, he previewed a snippet of the track. At the Paris Nightclub in Chicago, Illinois, Scott played the full version of the song, called "Pick Up the Phone". The duet track between Scott and Young Thug, featuring Quavo. On May 18, 2016, Scott performed a surprise show in Atlanta and confirmed the imminent release for the album, stating "I'm dropping my new album in a couple of fucking days". He went on to reveal that the album will feature "some of my favorite fucking artists".

On June 2, 2016, Scott took that song down, after posting it on his official SoundCloud page, stating that "This song was supposed to go to iTunes, but labels are making this more complicated than it actually need to be this was gonna be my single, but now I'm giving a way for the kids. P.S. They might take this down cause they don't want kids to eat".

On July 26, 2016, in a show in the Ford Amphitheater at Coney Island, Scott announced the release date for Birds in the Trap Sing McKnight, however, the album missed its release dates due to "technical difficulties" twice. After a free event named the Wav Party in Los Angeles, his music video for "90210" was showcased, while his music video for "Pick Up the Phone" has been released on Travis Scott's Vevo account on YouTube. Scott also revealed that Kid Cudi and Kendrick Lamar would appear on his album, with the production that would be provided by Cashmere Cat. On August 25, 2016, Mike Dean announced that the album was delayed again, due to the incompletion with the album's mixing. On August 31, 2016, Scott announced that he finally finished his album on his Instagram.

Recording and production
On July 18, 2016, in an interview with DJ Whoo Kid, Scott revealed that his biggest musical influence is Kid Cudi. It was announced that Cudi would be appearing on the album. This was revealed a month after Cudi announced that Scott would appear on his respective solo album, Passion, Pain & Demon Slayin'.

Release and promotion
On August 12, 2016, Scott premiered a song, "The Hooch" on the debut episode of his new Apple Music radio show Wav Radio with Chase B. The song was produced by Vinylz, Allen Ritter, Boi-1da and Mike Dean. Scott announced that the album would be released on August 26. On August 19, Scott premiered the new song, "Black Mass" on Wav Radio with Chase B. The song was produced by Murda Beatz and Cubeatz.

On September 2, 2016, Scott premiered the album with Chase B on Wav Radio. Scott then released the new song, "RaRa". The song features a guest appearance from American rapper Lil Uzi Vert, with the production was handled by TM88 and Cubeatz.

Singles
"Wonderful" featuring Canadian singer-songwriter the Weeknd, was serviced to rhythmic radio on February 16, 2016, as the album's lead single. The song was produced by T-Minus and Boi-1da, with co-production by Mike Dean, while the additional production by Scott himself. Its initial premiere occurred through Scott's SoundCloud account on December 31, 2015. The song peaked at number 23 on the Billboard Twitter Top Tracks chart and was certified platinum by Music Canada.

"Pick Up the Phone" with Young Thug, was released as the album's second single for retail sale and streaming on June 3, 2016. It features a guest appearance from American rapper Quavo and additional vocals from American singer Starrah, while the production was provided by Vinylz and Frank Dukes, with co-production by Allen Ritter and Dean. The music video for the single premiered on August 12, 2016. "Pick Up the Phone" peaked at number 43 on the US Billboard Hot 100. It is also included on Young Thug's mixtape Jeffery.

"Goosebumps" featuring Kendrick Lamar, was released as the album's third single on December 13, 2016. It was produced by Cardo, Yung Exclusive, Cubeatz and Mike Dean. The music video premiered on April 3, 2017, exclusively on Apple Music. The song peaked at number 32 on the Billboard Hot 100.

Critical reception

Birds in the Trap Sing McKnight was met with generally favorable reviews. At Metacritic, which assigns a normalized rating out of 100 to reviews from professional publications, the album received an average score of 64, based on eight reviews.

Matthew Cooper of Clash said, "While Scott might spend the 14 tracks telling us how incoherent he is, Birds in the Trap Sing McKnight is anything but". Scott Glaysher of HipHopDX said, "There isn't a ton of lyrical progression for La Flame on this album. ... But he uses a soothing digitized finish and weaves through the most polished contemporary drums in Hip Hop, it's truly hard to hate. That puzzling beauty is the best part about Scott's music". Matthew Strauss of Pitchfork said, "Birds in the Trap Sing McKnight escapes as Travis Scott's best work yet: a combination of elevated significance, self-awareness, and the old trick of spinning something so plain into something so luxurious". Preezy of XXL said, "Birds in the Trap Sing McKnight is a roller coaster ride of an experience, with an endless amount of highlights, whether it be an indelible hook here or timely guest verse there".

Andy Kellman of AllMusic said, "Swarming basslines and sluggish beats likewise form the rhythmic foundation, with gauzy and tickling keyboards adding sweetness to Scott's hedonistic hooks. Only on "Guidance", through scuttling drums granted by DF, is there a significant shake-up". Calum Slingerland of Exclaim! said, "Scott's hedonistic lyrics about sex and drugs remain awfully vapid for what's been billed as a trap masterpiece (the utterly banal "SDP Interlude" takes the cake). ... Scott's strength, of course, continues to lie in his ear for beats, with part of his appeal being his ability to make songs with less than rewarding subject matter still sound cool". Grant Rindner of PopMatters said, "The results here are highly mixed, and he might simply be the kind of artist who should take more time on his releases, even if that extra time isn't completely his choice". Mike Giegerich of Tiny Mix Tapes said, "Birdss stripped-down approach bares an utter lack of finesse behind a microphone".

Rankings
Complex placed Birds in the Trap Sing McKnight at number five on their "50 Best Albums of 2016" year-end list, while Variance placed it at number 38. XXL ranked it among the best 50 hip hop projects of 2016.

Commercial performance
Birds in the Trap Sing McKnight debuted at number one on the US Billboard 200, earning 88,000 album-equivalent units, of which 53,000 were pure album sales. It became Scott's first number one album. On May 22, 2017, the album was certified platinum by the Recording Industry Association of America (RIAA) for combined sales and album-equivalent units of over a million units in the United States.

Track listing

Notes
 signifies a co-producer
 signifies an additional producer
 All tracks are stylized in lowercase. For example, "Goosebumps" is stylized as "goosebumps".
 Featured artists are uncredited on digital marketplaces.
 "Pick Up the Phone" features uncredited vocals by Starrah

Sample credits
 "Through the Late Night" contains a portion of "Day 'n' Nite", written by Scott Mescudi and Oladipo Omishore, and performed by Kid Cudi.
 "Sweet Sweet" contains a sample of "La Cale" performed by Bertrand Eluerd.
 "SDP Interlude" contains a sample of "You and I", written by Caroline Polachek and Ernest Greene, and performed by Washed Out.
 "First Take" contains a sample of "Queen", written by Sy Brockington, Melvin Hough II and Rivelino Wouter, and performed by Sy Ari Da Kid.
 "Wonderful" contains a sample of "In the Meantime" performed by Tinashe and "We'll Be Fine" performed by Drake.

Personnel
Credits adapted from the album's liner notes.

Music

 21 Savage – featured artist (track 8)
 André 3000 – featured artist (track 1)
 Blac Youngsta – featured artist (track 3)
 Cassie – additional vocals (tracks 6, 12)
 Mike Dean – keyboards (tracks 7, 11, 12, 14), drum programming (track 14), vocoder (tracks 7, 14), guitars (track 2), piano (track 8)
 K. Forest – featured artist (track 13)
 Kid Cudi – featured artist (track 4), additional vocals (track 2)
 Kendrick Lamar – featured artist (track 9)
 Nav – featured artist (track 5)
 Quavo – featured artist (track 11)
 Swizz Beatz – additional vocals (track 2)
 Bryson Tiller – featured artist (track 10)
 Travis Scott – lead artist
 Starrah – additional vocals (track 11)
 The Weeknd – featured artist (track 14)
 Young Thug – lead artist (track 11)

Production

 André 3000 – additional vocal editing (track 1)
 James Blake – additional vocal editing (track 1)
 Boi-1da – production (track 14)
 Tristan Bott – recording assistance (tracks 5, 6, 9)
 Honorable C.N.O.T.E. – production (track 2)
 Cardo – production (tracks 3, 9)
 Cashmere Cat – production (track 2)
 Rogét Chahayed – additional production (track 2)
 Todd Cooper – additional engineering and arrangement (track 2)
 Philip "Dockz" Cromwell – recording assistance (tracks 8, 10)
 Cubeatz – co-production (tracks 3, 4, 7)
 Daxz – production (track 1)
 Mike Dean – production (tracks 12, 14), co-production (tracks 7, 11), additional production (tracks 2, 8, 9), mixing (tracks 1–12, 14), mastering
 dF – production (track 13)
 Frank Dukes – production (tracks 11, 12)
 Jason Goldberg – recording assistance (track 9)
 Blake Harden – recording (tracks 5, 6, 9, 12, 14), mixing (tracks 6, 13)
 Hit-Boy – production (track 2)
 Illa Jones – production (track 10)
 Kez Khou – mix assistance (tracks 3, 7–9, 14)
 Sean Klein – recording assistance (tracks 1, 13)
 Jason Lader – additional vocal editing (track 1)
 Jordan Lewis – recording (tracks 1–3, 9)
 Mel and Mus – co-production (track 10)
 Raphael Mesquita – recording assistance (track 5)
 Zeke Mishanec – recording (tracks 3, 4, 11, 13)
 Murda Beatz – production (tracks 7, 8)
 Nav – production (track 5), recording (track 5), mixing (track 5)
 Nisi – co-production (track 8)
 Ebony "WondaGurl" Oshunrinde – co-production (track 1)
 Oz – co-production (tracks 1, 8)
 Firas Quick – recording (tracks 8, 10)
 Dexter Randall – recording assistance (tracks 6, 12, 14)
 Ricci Riera – production (track 6)
 Brendan Silas Parry – recording assistance (tracks 3, 4)
 Allen Ritter – additional production (tracks 11, 12)
 Sy Ari Da Kid – production (track 10)
 T-Minus – production (track 14)
 TEAUXNY – production (track 10)
 TM88 – production (track 3)
 Travis Scott – co-production (track 14)
 Vinylz – production (tracks 1, 11, 12)

Managerial and design

 Corey Damon Black – art direction, design
 Anita Marisa Boriboon – creative direction (Epic Records)
 Mike Dean – executive production
 Jason Geter – executive production
 Nick Knight – creative direction, photography
 T.I. – executive production
 Travis Scott – executive production

Charts

Weekly charts

Year-end charts

Decade-end charts

Certifications

Release history

References 

2016 albums
Epic Records albums
Grand Hustle Records albums
ITunes-exclusive releases
Albums produced by Boi-1da
Albums produced by Cardo
Albums produced by Cashmere Cat
Albums produced by Frank Dukes
Albums produced by Honorable C.N.O.T.E.
Albums produced by Hit-Boy
Albums produced by Mike Dean (record producer)
Albums produced by Murda Beatz
Albums produced by Nav (rapper)
Albums produced by T-Minus (record producer)
Albums produced by Travis Scott
Albums produced by Vinylz
Albums produced by WondaGurl
Albums produced by Cubeatz
Travis Scott albums
Albums produced by TM88
Albums produced by Allen Ritter
Albums produced by Rogét Chahayed
Trap music albums